Diocese of Brisbane or Archdiocese of Brisbane could refer to:
Anglican Diocese of Brisbane
Roman Catholic Archdiocese of Brisbane